Jerichow is a 2008 German drama film written and directed by Christian Petzold. It is loosely inspired by the 1934 American novel The Postman Always Rings Twice by James M. Cain.

The film was invited into the competition of the 65th Venice Film Festival, as the first film to be shown, and was also nominated for the 2009 German Film Prize in the Best Feature Film and Best Director categories. The official German premiere was on 8 January 2009.  The American showings were in German with English subtitles. As the title suggests, the film takes place in the German town of Jerichow.

Plot summary
Thomas, a German veteran of the war in Afghanistan, helps Ali, a Turkish entrepreneur, after he crashes his car due to driving drunk. Ali hires Thomas, and Thomas and Laura, Ali's wife, start having an affair. As the drama unfolds, violence starts.

Cast
Benno Fürmann as Thomas
Nina Hoss as Laura
Hilmi Sözer as Ali Özkan
André Hennicke as Leon 
Claudia Geisler as Clerical assistant
Marie Gruber as Cashier
Knut Berger as Policeman

Reception
Wesley Morris, a writer for The Boston Globe, liked the film despite what he called silly romance and even sillier suspense. In a review for Philadelphia Weekly, Matt Prigge gave the film a mixed review with a B rating. Roderick Conway Morris, of International Herald Tribune, complimented the performances of the three actors. Roger Ebert gave the film a positive review, saying "Petzold, who also wrote the script, doesn't make level one thrillers, and his characters may be smarter than us, or dumber".

References
Notes

External links
 

2008 films
2000s German-language films
2000s Turkish-language films
2008 drama films
Films based on works by James M. Cain
Films directed by Christian Petzold
German drama films
2008 multilingual films
German multilingual films
2000s German films